Bombus monozonus is a species of cuckoo bumblebee.

References

Bumblebees
Insects described in 1931